Florida Citrus Mutual (FCM) is the industry trade group representing the citrus industry in the U.S. state of Florida.

The group was established in 1948 and claims a membership of 3000 growers. It is led by a 21-member board of directors, elected for one-year terms.

External links
Official website
Lobbying profile from  OpenSecrets

Food industry trade groups
Citrus industry in Florida
Organizations based in Florida